Mark Pellington (born March 17, 1962) is an American film director, writer, and producer.

Life and career
Pellington was born in Baltimore, Maryland, the son of Bill Pellington, an All-Pro linebacker who played football with the Baltimore Colts for 12 seasons. Mark graduated from the University of Virginia in 1984, which he attended on an athletic scholarship, playing attack on the lacrosse team. He worked at MTV from 1984–1990, winning awards as a promo producer and creating the landmark TV documentary series Buzz (1990). 

He became a freelance director in 1990, directing music videos for U2, Crystal Waters, De la Soul and Pearl Jam. His video for Pearl Jam's "Jeremy" won four MTV awards in 1993, including Best Director and Video of the Year, and his video for Whale's song "Hobo Humpin' Slobo Babe" won the inaugural MTV Europe Music Award for Best Video in 1994. 

Pellington then began directing feature films, including Going All the Way (1997), starring Ben Affleck and Rachel Weisz, Arlington Road (1999), starring Tim Robbins and Jeff Bridges, as well as The Mothman Prophecies (2002), starring Richard Gere dealing with mysterious deaths foretold by a strange red-eyed flying creature, Mothman.

Pellington has also worked with such musical artists as Alice In Chains, Demi Lovato, Imagine Dragons, Foo Fighters, Nine Inch Nails, Cage the Elephant, Linkin Park, Echosmith, The Fray, Dave Matthews, Michael Jackson, Public Enemy, Moby, Flaming Lips, Damian Marley, Chelsea Wolfe and Bruce Springsteen. He also made cameo appearances in The Mothman Prophecies, Almost Famous, and Jerry Maguire. He directed the landmark mini-series The United States of Poetry for PBS in 1995, which won the INPUT (International Public Television) Award, and created the look of pilots for hit network TV shows including Blindspot, Red Widow and Cold Case, as well as numerous commercials and personal documentaries, art projects and personal short films.

Feature film-wise, he also co-directed U2 3D (2005), Henry Poole Is Here (2008), I Melt with You (2011), The Last Word (2017), starring Shirley MacLaine and Amanda Seyfried, and Nostalgia (2018), starring Jon Hamm, Ellen Burstyn, Catherine Keener and Bruce Dern.

Filmography

Director

Feature films

Short films & documentaries

Television

Music videos

Producer filmography

References

External links

 Mark Pellington Official Website
 Mark Pellington's Guest DJ Set on KCRW KCRW Guest DJ Project

1962 births
Living people
American music video directors
American television directors
Artists from Baltimore
MTV Europe Music Award winners
Film directors from Maryland
University of Virginia alumni
American people of English descent 
American people of Welsh descent 
American people of Serbian descent